The 2022–23 Serbian SuperLiga (known as the Mozzart Bet SuperLiga for sponsorship reasons) is the 17th season of the Serbian SuperLiga since its establishment in 2006. Red Star are the defending champions, having won their 8th SuperLiga and 33rd domestic title in the previous season.

It began on 8 July 2022. As the 2022 FIFA World Cup started on 21 November, the last round before stoppage was held on 12–13 November. The league resumed games on 3 February 2023.

Summary 
Format of the competition remained the same as the last season - each team will play each other twice in round-robin format after which top half will play in Championship round and bottom half in Relegation round Play-offs. Last two teams from Relegation round will be relegated while teams finishing 13th and 14th will play Relegations play-off against teams who finished 3rd and 4th in Serbian First League. Teams can have unlimited number of foreign players with maximum of 4 at the pitch at any time. Similarly at least one player born after 1 January 2001 must be on the pitch at any time.

This season marked the start of a new three-year title sponsorship rights with Mozzart bet betting company.

Teams 

Sixteen teams will compete in the league, the top 14 from previous season and two teams promoted from Serbian First League. Promoted teams were Mladost GAT who are promoted to the SuperLiga for the first time in their history and Javor who will return to the top flight after one-year absence. They will replace Proleter and Metalac.

Stadium and locations

Personnel, Kits and General sponsor

Note: Flags indicate national team as has been defined under FIFA eligibility rules. Players and Managers may hold more than one non-FIFA nationality.

Nike is the official ball supplier for Serbian SuperLiga.

Kelme is the official sponsor of the Referee's Committee of the Football Association of Serbia.

Managerial changes

Regular season

League table

Results

Individual statistics

Top goalscorers
As of matches played on 17 March 2023.

Hat-tricks

Player of the week
As of matches played on 13 March 2023.

Awards

Monthly awards

References

External links
 
 UEFA
 soccerway.com

Serbia
Serbian SuperLiga seasons
Superliga
2022–23 in Serbian football leagues